Nathan Dawe (born 25 May 1994) is an English DJ and producer. He is best known for his 2020 single "Lighter" featuring KSI, which reached number 3 on the UK Singles Chart.

Early life and career 
Nathan Dawe was born in Burton upon Trent on 25 May 1994 and attended Blessed Robert Sutton Catholic Sports College. He is a lifelong supporter of Aston Villa football club.

He built a loyal following by releasing mixes on Soundcloud. Rather than the usual genre-specific mixes being put out, he released mashup multi-genre mixes covering everything from house music to hip-hop, reggae, bassline and pop. Nathan was the first DJ without a radio show or hit single to sell out his own concert at the O2. He said, "It took me to the point where I was headlining massive festivals and performing sell out shows in huge clubs. I knew that wouldn't last forever, particularly with the rise of things like Spotify, so I set up a four-year plan and delved deeper into the production side of the industry." He began remixing other producers in his early twenties. 

His debut single, "Cheatin'", based on an uncredited sample of Deborah Cox's "It's Over Now", was released in August 2018 and peaked at number 94 on the UK Singles Chart. In May 2019, he released the single "Repeat After Me", featuring vocals from Melissa Steel. He released the single "Flowers" in October 2019, featuring vocals from garage legend Malika and credited vocals from rapper Jaykae. Nathan's 'Flowers' peaked at number 12 on the UK Singles Chart. 

On 24 July 2020, his song "Lighter", which he made in collaboration with British YouTuber KSI and singer Ella Henderson, was released. After the chart success in the UK, he was signed to Warner/Chappell Music.

On 25 November 2020, Dawe released the song "No Time for Tears" with British girl group Little Mix. On 9 April 2021, Dawe collaborated with Anne-Marie and rapper MoStack on the song "Way Too Long".
On 24 September 2021, Dawe released the song with English DJ T. Matthias called "Goodbye".

On 29 April 2022, he released the song "21 Reasons" featuring Ella Henderson, which became one of two songs in the UK Top 30 in June 2022 based around
 same "Calabria" sample (the other being by West London drill rapper Benzz).

Discography

Singles

Remixes

Production and songwriting credits

References 

1994 births
Living people
English DJs
English record producers
English house musicians
Electronic dance music DJs
People from Burton upon Trent
Musicians from Staffordshire
Atlantic Records artists